Estefanía Bacca is an Argentine vedette, acrobat-dancer, actress, model and choreographer. She received her licence as dance instructor (specialist in musical comedy) in Instituto Universitario Nacional de Arte in Buenos Aires. She has modeled for Paparazzi Online and Maxim in Argentina.

Career

Estefanía started her theater career as a small role actress and simple burlesque dancer in revue shows from 2007 and 2010, all in the same company, "Faroni Producciones" of actress-comedian and director Carmen Barbieri and producer and founder of the company, Javier Faroni.

In late-2010 Bacca was cast in the revue musical Excitante as the second vedette bested by Adabel Guerrero and Jésica Cirio in Mar del Plata. Estefanía was the second vedette on the magazine play El Anfitrión for the 2011–12 theatrical season in Villa Carlos Paz. The musical was led by María Martha Serra Lima as the lead attraction and Mónica González Listorti as the first vedette accompanied by her Bailando professional dance partner Maximiliano D'Iorio as the first dancer. The show's creative director was the Austrian vedette, Reina Reech. Also in the show as the actor-comedian, "Cacho" Buenaventura and the magician, Emanuel. The musical debuted in Córdoba, Argentina, 16 December 2011 in the theater, Candilejas I. Bacca won an award for best vedette, for her work in El Anfitrión.

She performed part of a non-musical theater comedy, Sin Comerla ni Beberla alongside René Bertrand, Sabrina Olmedo, Emiliano Rella, Belén Giménez, Pamela Sosa and Leandro Orowitz, directed by René Bertrand and produced-writing by Gerardo Sofovich in Mar del Plata. They debuted on 28 December 2012 in the theater Re Fa Si. Currently, Bacca is the lead vedette of the music hall, "Divain" in Mar del Plata, Argentina alongside Aníbal Pachano, Gustavo Wons, Maia Contreras, Nicolás Armengol and others. The theater show received six nomination including two for female revelations, one being for Estefanía.

See also 
List of glamour models

References

Sources 
 

Living people
People from Reconquista, Santa Fe
Argentine people of Spanish descent
Argentine people of Italian descent
Argentine people of Israeli descent
Dance teachers
Argentine choreographers
Argentine female dancers
Argentine erotic dancers
Dance musicians
Argentine female models
Argentine stage actresses
Cabaret singers
Participants in Argentine reality television series
Argentine vedettes
Argentine entertainers
Burlesque performers
Argentine musical theatre female dancers
Argentine musical theatre women singers
Argentine musical theatre actresses
Argentine theatrical dancer-actresses
1988 births
21st-century Argentine dancers
21st-century Argentine women